"Woman's Gotta Have It" is a song written by Darryl Carter, Bobby Womack and Linda Womack. The song was recorded at American Sound Studio in Memphis, Tennessee.

Song background
The idea for the song came from a marital situation that Darryl Carter knew of where the wife was about to "tip out" on an unresponsive husband. Carter and Linda Womack (the daughter of Sam Cooke and one-time stepdaughter of Bobby who later married Bobby's brother, Cecil) originally wrote the song with Jackie Wilson in mind.

Chart performance
Released as a single from Bobby's 1972 album Understanding, it reached number one on the R&B chart and peaked at number 60 on the pop chart in the US.

Wendy Matthews' version

Australian recording artist Wendy Matthews released a version of the song in January 1991 as the second single from her debut solo studio album, Émigré. The song peaked at number 34 on the ARIA Charts.

Track listing
CD/7" Single 
 "Woman's Gotta Have It" - 4:21
 "Acid Rain" - 3:27

12" Single
 "Woman's Gotta Have It" (Club Mix)	
 "Acid Rain"	
 "Woman's Gotta Have It" (Club Dub)	
 "Token Angels"

Charts

Other versions
The song was later covered by James Taylor and included on Taylor's 1976 album In the Pocket. Rolling Stone critic Kit Rachlis described this version as "listless."  On the other hand, Record World said that "Taylor's breezy vocal sound suits material like this Bobby Womack number perfectly."  
It has also been covered by Nona Gaye for the compilation 1-800-NEW FUNK
The Neville Brothers on their: "Live At Tipitina's, September 24, 1982" LP 
K-Ci covered it on his 2006 album "My Book"
Taylor Hicks on his 2009 album The Distance, and Calvin Richardson.

See also
List of Best Selling Soul Singles number ones of 1972

References 

1972 songs
1972 singles
1991 singles
1977 singles
Bobby Womack songs
James Taylor songs
Wendy Matthews songs
Songs written by Bobby Womack
Songs written by Linda Womack
Song recordings produced by Bobby Womack
United Artists Records singles